|}

The Rowland Meyrick Handicap Chase is a Premier Handicap National Hunt steeplechase in Great Britain which is open to horses aged four years or older. It is run at Wetherby over a distance of about 3 miles (3 miles and 45 yards or 4,869 metres), and during its running there are nineteen fences to be jumped. It is a handicap race, and it is scheduled to take place each year on Boxing Day.

The event is named in honour of Rowland Meyrick, who was appointed Clerk of the course at Wetherby in 1920. At this time Meyrick was also a member of the Wetherby Race Company, an organisation which was formed to purchase the lease of the racecourse. The Rowland Meyrick Handicap Chase held Grade 3 status from 2005, though it arguably reached its peak in the 1980s when Forgive 'n Forget and The Thinker both won it in the same season they would win the Cheltenham Gold Cup. The race was re-classified as a Premier Handicap from the 2022 running when Grade 3 status was renamed by the British Horseracing Authority.

Winners
 Weights given in stones and pounds.

See also
 Horse racing in Great Britain
 List of British National Hunt races

References

 Racing Post:

 pedigreequery.com – Rowland Meyrick Handicap Chase – Wetherby.
 greyhoundderby.com – Brief history of Wetherby Racecourse.
 

National Hunt races in Great Britain
Wetherby Racecourse
National Hunt chases
Recurring sporting events established in 1957
1957 establishments in England